Naewonsa is a Buddhist temple of the Jogye Order in Seoul, South Korea. It is located in San 1 Jeongneung-dong in the Seongbuk-gu area of the city.

See also
List of Buddhist temples in Seoul

External links
koreatemple.net

Buddhist temples in Seoul
Seongbuk District
Buddhist temples of the Jogye Order